The following is a partial list of the "N" codes for Medical Subject Headings (MeSH), as defined by the United States National Library of Medicine (NLM).

This list continues the information at List of MeSH codes (N03). Codes following these are found at List of MeSH codes (N05). For other MeSH codes, see List of MeSH codes.

The source for this content is the set of 2006 MeSH Trees from the NLM.

– health services administration

– organization and administration
  – annual reports
  – appointments and schedules
  – waiting lists
  – committee membership
  – constitution and bylaws
  –  organizational decision making
  –  organizational efficiency
  – eligibility determination
  – fee schedules
  – relative value scales
  – governing board
  – trustees
  – hospital administration
  –  hospital ancillary services
  – centralized hospital services
  –  hospital financial management
  – hospital communication systems
  – hospital departments
  –  hospital admitting department
  –  hospital anesthesia department
  –  hospital cardiology service
  –  hospital central supply
  –  hospital chaplaincy service
  –  hospital dental service
  –  hospital education department
  –  hospital emergency service
  – trauma centers
  –  hospital food service
  –  hospital housekeeping
  –  hospital laboratories
  –  hospital laundry service
  –  hospital maintenance and engineering
  –  hospital medical records department
  –  hospital nuclear medicine department
  –  hospital nursing service
  –  hospital obstetrics and gynecology department
  –  hospital occupational therapy department
  –  hospital oncology service
  –  hospital outpatient clinics
  – pain clinics
  –  hospital pathology department
  –  hospital personnel administration
  –  hospital pharmacy service
  –  hospital physical therapy department
  –  hospital psychiatric department
  –  hospital purchasing
  – group purchasing
  –  hospital radiology department
  –  hospital respiratory therapy department
  –  hospital social work department
  –  hospital surgery department
  –  hospital urology department
  – hospital distribution systems
  – hospital information systems
  – clinical pharmacy information systems
  – medical order entry systems
  – operating room information systems
  – point-of-care systems
  – radiology information systems
  – hospital-patient relations
  – hospital-physician relations
  – medical staff privileges
  – hospital restructuring
  – hospital-physician joint ventures
  – physician self-referral
  – hospital shared services
  – hospital shops
  –  hospital libraries
  –  hospital materials management
  –  hospital inventories
  –  hospital medication systems
  – product line management
  – institutional management teams
  – management audit
  – benchmarking
  – management information systems
  – ambulatory care information systems
  – clinical laboratory information systems
  – clinical pharmacy information systems
  – database management systems
  –  management decision support systems
  – healthcare common procedure coding system
  – hospital information systems
  – ambulatory care information systems
  – clinical laboratory information systems
  – clinical pharmacy information systems
  – medical order entry systems
  – operating room information systems
  – point-of-care systems
  – radiology information systems
  – office automation
  – word processing
  – personnel staffing and scheduling information systems
  – radiology information systems
  – teleradiology
  – mandatory programs
  – medication systems
  –  hospital medication systems
  –  organizational models
  – multi-institutional systems
  – hospital shared services
  – organizational affiliation
  – transfer agreement
  – organizational culture
  – organizational innovation
  – entrepreneurship
  – organizational objectives
  – ownership
  – private sector
  – privatization
  – public sector
  – patient identification systems
  – personnel management
  – career mobility
  – collective bargaining
  – employee discipline
  – employee grievances
  – employee incentive plans
  – employee performance appraisal
  – job application
  – job description
  – management quality circles
  – negotiating
  –  hospital personnel administration
  – personnel delegation
  – personnel downsizing
  – personnel loyalty
  – personnel selection
  – personnel staffing and scheduling
  – personnel turnover
  – physician incentive plans
  – salaries and fringe benefits
  – family leave
  – parental leave
  –  employee health benefit plans
  – employee retirement income security act
  – sick leave
  – staff development
  –  employee strikes
  – workload
  – workplace
  – pharmacy administration
  – drug and narcotic control
  – drug utilization
  – drug utilization review
  – planning techniques
  – professional practice
  – group practice
  –  dental group practice
  –  prepaid group practice
  – health maintenance organizations
  – independent practice associations
  – hospital-physician relations
  – medical staff privileges
  – house calls
  – institutional practice
  – management service organizations
  – nursing
  –  private duty nursing
  –  supervisory nursing
  – office nursing
  – nursing faculty practice
  – office management
  – office visits
  – partnership practice
  –  dental partnership practice
  – practice management
  – office management
  – forms and records control
  –  dental practice management
  –  medical practice management
  – practice valuation and purchase
  – private practice
  – fee-for-service plans
  – independent practice associations
  – professional autonomy
  – professional corporations
  – professional practice location
  – professional staff committees
  – ethics committees
  –  clinical ethics committees
  –  research ethics committees
  – pharmacy and therapeutics committee
  – referral and consultation
  – ethics consultation
  – gatekeeping
  – physician self-referral
  – remote consultation
  – program development
  – public health administration
  – public relations
  – anniversaries and special events
  – community-institutional relations
  – consumer satisfaction
  – patient satisfaction
  – hospital-patient relations
  – hospital-physician relations
  – interdepartmental relations
  – interinstitutional relations
  – records
  – birth certificates
  – consent forms
  – death certificates
  – dental records
  – diet records
  – hospital records
  – medical records
  – medical record linkage
  –  problem-oriented medical records
  –  computerized medical records systems
  – medical order entry systems
  – trauma severity indices
  – abbreviated injury scale
  – glasgow coma scale
  – glasgow outcome scale
  – injury severity score
  – nursing records
  – registries
  – seer program
  – risk management
  – risk assessment
  – risk adjustment
  –  financial risk sharing
  – safety management
  – safety management
  – security measures
  – computer security
  – time management
  – total quality management
  – voluntary programs

– patient care management
  – comprehensive health care
  – comprehensive dental care
  – nursing process
  – nursing assessment
  – nursing diagnosis
  – nursing research
  – clinical nursing research
  – nursing administration research
  – nursing education research
  – nursing evaluation research
  – nursing methodology research
  – patient care planning
  – advance care planning
  – advance directives
  – living wills
  – case management
  – critical pathways
  – patient-centered care
  – primary health care
  – continuity of patient care
  – patient-centered care
  – refusal to treat
  – progressive patient care
  – critical pathways
  – delivery of health care
  – after-hours care
  – answering services
  –  professional delegation
  –  integrated delivery of health care
  – provider-sponsored organizations
  – health care reform
  – health services accessibility
  – managed care programs
  – competitive medical plans
  – health maintenance organizations
  – independent practice associations
  – patient freedom of choice laws
  – preferred provider organizations
  – provider-sponsored organizations
  – product line management
  – telemedicine
  – remote consultation
  – telepathology
  – teleradiology
  – uncompensated care
  – dentist's practice patterns
  – disease management
  – patient care team
  –  team nursing
  – patient-centered care
  – patient selection
  – physician's practice patterns
  – point-of-care systems

– quality of health care
  – clinical competence
  – dental audit
  – advance directive adherence
  – guideline adherence
  – medical audit
  – commission on professional and hospital activities
  – nursing audit
  – outcome and process assessment (health care)
  – outcome assessment (health care)
  – treatment outcome
  – treatment failure
  – process assessment (health care)
  –  health care peer review
  – professional review organizations
  – program evaluation
  – benchmarking
  –  health care quality assurance
  – benchmarking
  – guidelines
  – codes of ethics
  – practice guidelines
  – total quality management
  –  health care quality indicators
  – risk adjustment
  – utilization review
  – concurrent review
  – drug utilization review

The list continues at List of MeSH codes (N05).

N04